

DJ Awards

DJ Magazine top 100 DJs

Echo Award

Electronic Music Awards

iHeartRadio Music Awards

International Dance Music Awards

Kids' Choice Awards

MTV Europe Music Awards

MTV Millennial Awards

MTV Video Music Awards

NRJ DJ Awards

Teen Choice Awards

The Buma Awards

WDM Radio Awards

World Music Awards

Young Hollywood Awards

YouTube Creator Awards
Martin Garrix   (14.3 million subscribers - April 2022)

STMPD RCRDS (506 thousand subscribers - April 2022)

YouTube Music Awards

Notes

References

Garrix, Martin